Minhaj-al-Din Abu Amr Othman ibn Siraj-al-Din Muhammad Juzjani (born 1193), simply known as Minhaj al-Siraj Juzjani, was a 13th-century Persian historian born in the region of Ghur.

In 1227, Juzjani migrated to Ucch then to Delhi. Juzjani was the principal historian for the Mamluk Sultanate of Delhi in northern India.<ref>Shafique N. Virani, The Ismailis in the Middle Ages: A History of Survival, A Search for Salvation, (Oxford University Press, 2007), 23;"Minhaj-i-Siraj Juzjani, the foremost historian of the Delhi Sultanate, wrote his "Nasirid Generations"(Tabaqat-i Nasiri)...."</ref> and wrote of the Ghurid dynasty. He also wrote the Tabaqat-i Nasiri (1260 CE) for Sultan'' Nasiruddin Mahmud Shah of Delhi. He died after 1266.

See also
Muslim chronicles for Indian history

References

Sources

Further reading

External links

 Tabaqat-i-Nasiri at Banglapedia.
 Tabaqat-i Nasiri at Iranica online.

1193 births
13th-century writers
Year of death missing
13th-century deaths
Chroniclers
12th-century Iranian people
13th-century Iranian people
Mamluk dynasty (Delhi)
People of the Ghurid Empire
Iranian emigrants to India
Historians of India
People from Jowzjan Province